Goshen is an unincorporated community in Bingham County, in the U.S. state of Idaho.

History

The first settlement at Goshen was made in 1883. A post office called Goshen was established in 1896, and remained in operation until 1905. The community was named after the Land of Goshen, a place mentioned in the Hebrew Bible.

References

Unincorporated communities in Bingham County, Idaho